Coedymwstwr Woodlands is a Site of Special Scientific Interest located between Coychurch and Pencoed in Bridgend County Borough, south Wales.

See also
List of Sites of Special Scientific Interest in Mid & South Glamorgan

Sites of Special Scientific Interest in Bridgend County Borough
Pencoed